Christchurch Airport  is the main airport that serves Christchurch, New Zealand. Christchurch (Harewood) Airport officially opened on 18 May 1940 and became New Zealand's first international airport on 16 December 1950. It is the third busiest airport in New Zealand, after Auckland and Wellington, by both annual passengers and aircraft movements. Christchurch and Auckland are the only airports in New Zealand that regularly handle Boeing 747 and Airbus A380 aircraft. The airport is curfew free, operating 24 hours a day.

The prevailing wind in Christchurch is from the north-east and to a lesser extent from the south-west, but the city is also affected by Canterbury's nor'wester foehn wind. As a result, the airport has two perpendicular runways: a  primary runway (02/20) oriented with the north-easterly and south-westerly prevailing winds, and a  secondary runway (11/29) oriented for use during nor'westers. The airport also has a third grass runway, parallel to the primary runway, for use by general aviation. To serve an increasing number of passengers, the airport has completed construction of a major terminal upgrade. The new construction's primary wing opened in 2011 and the upgrade was completed in 2013.

History

In 1935, the local council decided to locate a new aerodrome at Harewood as the best site for Christchurch.
Development of the aerodrome at Harewood commenced in 1936 when 227 hectares of land was purchased. In 1937, a 915-metre runway and a 60 square metre terminal were constructed. In 1940, the airport became RNZAF Station Harewood. By 1946 the form of the terminal area development was established with hangars, a small terminal building, the water tower and some barracks buildings. In 1950, Christchurch Airport received clearance for international operations from the government. The two runways and parallel taxiway concept was established in 1953–;runway 02/20 at 2,012 metres and 11/29 at 1,741m. In 1954, TEAL introduced Douglas DC-6 aircraft to its trans-Tasman services. In February 1960, a new terminal building, designed by architect Paul Pascoe, was brought into operation.

In April 1965, scheduled jet services were launched by Qantas to Sydney using the Boeing 707.

Later in 1966, an international wing was added to the domestic terminal. In October 1968, NAC operated its first Boeing 737 to the airport. SAFE Air introduced a Chatham Island air link to Christchurch in December 1969. In 1972 the north-west runway was completely resealed and repainted. The first scheduled Boeing 747 service to land in New Zealand arrived on 3 December 1972, a Qantas flight from Sydney. Air New Zealand introduced its McDonnell Douglas DC-10 aircraft to trans-Tasman services from 31 October 1973.

Extensions to the domestic terminal were completed in 1975 with a new two level pier added, extending the total floor space to 16,000 square metres. In October that year, Air New Zealand began a weekly DC-8 service linking Christchurch to Nadi, Rarotonga and Papeete. Air New Zealand opened its No.1 Hangar at the airport in August 1979. In December 1980 the two Australian domestic airlines Ansett and Trans Australia Airlines commenced scheduled services from Hobart within a few days of each other.
In July 1984, a main runway extension was completed, the runway was lengthened 845 metres to the northeast, to a total of 3,287 metres. In February 1985, Newmans Air started scheduled de Havilland Canada Dash 7 services on the tourist routes. The first ever Air New Zealand Boeing 767 service to Melbourne and the inaugural Air New Zealand Boeing 747-200 service to Los Angeles via Honolulu and Nadi (known as the southern connection) departed in October 1985.
In October 1986, Singapore Airlines started Boeing 747 services to the city. The following month, the first British Airways Boeing 747 flight from London arrived. In July 1987, Ansett New Zealand started flying on domestic trunk routes using Boeing 737 aircraft. Also in 1987, the terminal was extended to accommodate Ansett New Zealand and new Air New Zealand lounges; and domestic airbridges were added. Thai Airways began a weekly DC-10 service from Bangkok in November 1988. In March 1989, Air New Zealand introduced a weekly Boeing 747 service from Tokyo and the following month a Boeing 767 service to Perth was introduced. Although dropped years later, the Perth route was restored on a seasonal basis in 2013 with the same aircraft until 2016, when it was upgauged to a Boeing 787 Dreamliner. Also in April 1989 saw the first visit to Christchurch by a British Airways Concorde, on a world tour. In September 1990, stage 1 of the International Antarctic Centre tourist attraction was officially opened.

Air Pacific (now Fiji Airways) started a weekly direct flight to Nadi, Fiji in April 1993. Korean Airlines commenced flying to Christchurch in July 1994 using MD-11 aircraft, this was a weekly service from Seoul.
In April 1997 Origin Pacific Airways started operations at the airport with flights to Nelson.
The Canterbury Aero Club opened a new complex to the north-west side of the airport in October 1998.
In September 1998, the new international terminal building was completed, creating an additional 28,000 square metres of floor space.
In 2004, expansion of the international terminal was completed to create five more international stands and four more international airbridges. Pacific Blue Airlines commenced trans-Tasman flights from Christchurch (its New Zealand base) in January 2004. Emirates started flying to Christchurch from Dubai and Melbourne with Airbus A340 aircraft in July 2004, later switching to a Sydney-Bangkok-Dubai service with a Boeing 777-300ER aircraft before upgrading to a daily Airbus A380 service while dropping Bangkok on 30 October 2016. Jetstar started serving the city with trans-Tasman flights in December 2005. Construction of the five level carpark building commenced in March 2006. Origin Pacific ceased operations in September 2006.

In April 2011, Air Asia X commenced Airbus A330 services to Kuala Lumpur; these were short lived, ending in May 2012. China Airlines operated seasonal flights from Taipei via Sydney with Airbus A330 aircraft from December 2014 to 2018. An unusual irregular visitor is Uzbekistan Airways, which operates Boeing 767 charters from Tashkent via Kuala Lumpur carrying Russian fishing crews.

Airport redevelopment
Christchurch Airport underwent an extensive expansion project, beginning in March 2006 when construction commenced on a new multi-storey $13 million car park building which opened early in 2007. The new building provided 570 new covered car spaces. Once it was complete, part of the existing car park area was closed to allow for the extra space required for the expanded footprint of a new terminal building. A new 45m tall control tower, positioned close to the new car park building, opened in September 2009. A separate $20 million regional lounge was constructed in 2010 in a joint venture by Air New Zealand and CIAL.

In early 2009, work commenced on replacing the old domestic terminal with a new integrated terminal precinct (ITP) to be built over the existing one. The new terminal replaced the existing aging domestic terminal and expanded the facilities of the much newer international terminal. The new building includes:
a combined check-in area servicing both domestic and international passengers,
a large landside retail and food precinct,
new domestic departure and arrival lounges with enhanced retail facilities,
new domestic and expanded international baggage claim areas inclusive of a separate regional/small aircraft baggage claim,
new international customs arrivals area, inclusive of a natural experience of New Zealand,
three swing-style boarding gates accessible from both the domestic and international departure areas so aircraft do not need to change gates,
a new taxiway incorporated into the domestic aircraft parking apron to allow for more efficient aircraft movements,
new coach and drop off facilities that eliminate the terminal frontage road in accordance with new international ICAO guidelines.

Stage 1 of the new terminal, including the new check-in hall, new food/retail precinct, new single domestic security screening, and the new regional departure lounge and baggage claim of the new terminal was completed in May 2011, allowing the old international check-in and the old domestic terminal north of the main pier to be demolished to make way for Stage 2. Stage 2, which includes the new domestic baggage claim and the northern half of the new domestic departure lounge was completed in February 2012.

The old domestic terminal was completely demolished to make way for the new terminal. All construction was completed by late 2012, with some work such as demolition of the old pier continuing into 2013. Between 200 and 400 workers were active on the site each work day for almost four years. Despite 11,000 earthquakes, the terminal project was completed on budget. The new terminal was officially opened by Prime Minister John Key on 18 April 2013.

Kowhai Park
The airport is to build a solar farm on 400 hectares of land to power the airport. As part of its sustainability goals, it will be big enough to power 20% of Christchurch

Runways
The preferred option by the airport company for increasing the capacity of the existing runways is by introducing independent operations. This can be achieved by adding a 300m extension to the north-eastern end of the main runway 20/02 which would give it a total length of 3,600m. When the prevailing north-easterly winds are blowing this would allow for intersection departures for most aircraft types while other aircraft land on runway 11. Large wide body aircraft would still have to use the full length of the runway.
The runway 11/29 would be widened to 45m and extended by 250m to the north-west into the Harewood golf course; the airport has purchased land from the club already. This would increase the runway length to 1,981 metres and is estimated to cost $12 million. As presently some Tasman and Pacific Island flights are unable to take off fully loaded in Nor-west wind conditions. A runway end safety area (RESA) will be added to each end to make it comply with ICAO standards. Eventually all the runways will have a RESA. 
Also Runway 11/29 may be lengthened up to 2,000m to provide for enhanced take-off capability for Code D (Boeing 767-sized aircraft) and Code E (Boeing 777, Boeing 787, Airbus A350) aircraft flying on medium and long haul routes in northwest wind operational conditions. When completed with peak operation periods both runways will be used simultaneously.
Statistics indicated that Runway 02 was used 70% of the time, Runway 20 at 20%, Runway 29 at 8% and Runway 11 (predominantly for landings) at 2% of the time.

Terminal and gates
Christchurch Airport consists of a single terminal that caters for both domestic and international flights. It is 77,591m2 in size and is situated at the intersection of the two sealed runways.

The main terminal building contains a combined check-in hall for domestic and international flights. It has 58 check-in counters, in addition to self-service check-in kiosks. A common baggage claim hall is also located on the ground floor. There is a large retail area on the first floor, with many food and retail outlets as well as waiting areas. A major feature of the terminal is a $15 million state-of-the-art baggage handling system, which is 750 metres long.

The airport has 37 gates in total. The regional wing is located in the south-west of the terminal, and handles all Air New Zealand Link turboprop flights. It has 12 gates, numbered 3–14. The central zone handles mainline Air New Zealand and Jetstar domestic services and has eight gates (16–22a) and gates(15,15a,15b,15c); all (except Gate 15, which can be shared with turboprops) are equipped with jetbridges. The international wing is located in the north-east section of the terminal and has 13 gates (23–35), all except 31 and 33 have jetbridges. Gates 21/24 and 22/25 are shared swing gates which can be used for domestic or international flights as the need arises. Gate 30 has a dual jetbridge which is used for the Airbus A380. When available it can also accommodate two narrow body jets gate position 30R and 30L.

Airlines and destinations
As of April 2015, Christchurch airport is served by 12 airlines with scheduled services. The airport has direct flights to 18 domestic and 11 international destinations. A total of 900 scheduled domestic and 157 international flights arrive and depart each week.

Passenger

Cargo

Statistics

As the gateway for Christchurch and the South Island, Christchurch International Airport is New Zealand's second largest airport.

A total of 5,709,272 passengers travelled in and out of Christchurch International Airport in the 12 months to 31 July 2014, an increase of 3.6 percent over the previous year.

A record 6.31 million passengers travelled in the 2016 year. Airline seat capacity grew 7% to 7.9 million passengers with several new services starting.

Traffic

Operations

Military

Since the closure of RNZAF Base Wigram, the Royal New Zealand Air Force (RNZAF) always flies to Christchurch International Airport when required to visit the city. There are regular RNZAF flights between Wellington, Ohakea, Auckland.

With the development of Antarctic scientific expeditions, since the 1950s Christchurch Airport has been the base for all Antarctic flights operated by the United States Navy, the United States Air Force, the United States Air National Guard, and the Royal New Zealand Air Force as part of Operation Deep Freeze.

SOFIA

In July 2013 a Boeing 747SP modified as the Stratospheric Observatory for Infrared Astronomy (SOFIA) airborne telescope landed at the airport. A spokesman said it was likely that Christchurch would be a winter base for SOFIA for twenty years. The city was chosen as a southern hemisphere base because of the long airport runway; and the favourable atmospheric conditions and relatively empty airspace in southern New Zealand.

General aviation
There are several general aviation organisations operating from the airport. Garden City Helicopters operates from a base adjacent to the airport (ICAO: NZGI). It operates a medivac service using fixed-wing aircraft (NZ Flying Doctor Service), charter flights and also operates the rescue helicopter in Canterbury with a secondary helipad in Hagley Park adjacent to Christchurch Hospital (ICAO: NZJC). Christchurch International Airport Limited maintains a grass runway parallel to the primary runway for the Canterbury Aero Club. Among the general aviation companies, Mainland Air operates flights to Oamaru. Air Safaris runs a link service to Lake Tekapo Airport.

Aviation services
The Christchurch Engine Centre, established in 1953, is located at the airport and is now a joint facility run by Pratt & Whitney and Air New Zealand. A full MRO service is offered to IAE V2500 engines. Formerly, PW JT8D and Rolls-Royce Dart engines were overhauled at the facility.
Air New Zealand has several maintenance facilities at the airport such as 1 Hangar (which can accommodate six Code C aircraft), 3 Hangar (one Code C aircraft) and 5 Hangar (one Code C aircraft) but no longer has a paint hangar.

Access, ground transport, and parking
The main access road into the airport connects to both
Russley Road (State Highway 1) and Memorial Avenue at a diamond interchange.

A drop off and pick up area called 'The Loop' is situated on the ground floor of the multi-level car park building. A number of different taxi and shuttle companies operate services from the airport terminals. Uber also partnered with CIAL to have a dedicated pick-up and drop-off zone for its service.

Three different city bus routes service the airport terminal: the number 3 route to the central city via Avonhead and Riccarton, continuing to Sumner; the number 29 route to the central city via Fendalton; and the number 125 on its route from Redwood to Halswell.

Accidents and incidents
 On 21 November 1957 at 11.33am a SAFE Air Bristol Freighter (registered ZK-AYH) suffered a catastrophic structural failure on a flight from Paraparaumu to Oamaru and crashed on the Russley Golf Course very near the airport with the loss of all four lives.
 On 6 June 2003, an Air Adventures New Zealand Ltd Piper PA-31 Chieftain (registered ZK-NCA) crashed into trees and terrain  short of runway 20, killing the pilot and seven of the nine passengers onboard. The aircraft was flying too low during an ILS approach in foggy weather.
 An attempted hijacking of Eagle Airways Flight 2279 from Blenheim to Christchurch occurred on 8 February 2008. After the British Aerospace Jetstream 32EP landed, the offender, a Somalian woman, was overpowered by the two pilots and she was later arrested at the scene on Runway 29 after the aircraft came to a stop.
In November 2014, a New Zealand Member of Parliament, Gerry Brownlee, was fined $2000 by the Civil Aviation Authority for a breach of security that occurred at Christchurch Airport on 24 July 2014. An official inquiry found that Brownlee (then Minister of Transport) and two of his aides had evaded security screening by entering a departure lounge through an exit door while in a rush to board a domestic flight.

Demographics

Christchurch Airport had a population of 177 at the 2018 New Zealand census, an increase of 9 people (5.4%) since the 2013 census, and a decrease of 6 people (-3.3%) since the 2006 census. There were 75 households. There were 99 males and 75 females, giving a sex ratio of 1.32 males per female. The median age was 50.1 years (compared with 37.4 years nationally), with 21 people (11.9%) aged under 15 years, 39 (22.0%) aged 15 to 29, 87 (49.2%) aged 30 to 64, and 30 (16.9%) aged 65 or older.

Ethnicities were 81.4% European/Pākehā, 16.9% Māori, 6.8% Asian, and 3.4% other ethnicities (totals add to more than 100% since people could identify with multiple ethnicities).

The proportion of people born overseas was 18.6%, compared with 27.1% nationally.

Although some people objected to giving their religion, 47.5% had no religion, 37.3% were Christian, 3.4% were Muslim and 1.7% had other religions.

Of those at least 15 years old, 12 (7.7%) people had a bachelor or higher degree, and 45 (28.8%) people had no formal qualifications. The median income was $29,100, compared with $31,800 nationally. The employment status of those at least 15 was that 75 (48.1%) people were employed full-time, 33 (21.2%) were part-time, and 6 (3.8%) were unemployed.

See also
 List of airports in New Zealand
 List of airlines of New Zealand
 List of busiest airports in New Zealand
 Transport in New Zealand

References

Bibliography

External links

Airport website
CIAL's commercial property website
Canterbury Aero Club website

Transport in Christchurch
Airports in New Zealand
Airports established in 1937
Government-owned companies of New Zealand
1937 establishments in New Zealand
Transport buildings and structures in Canterbury, New Zealand
International airports in New Zealand